The British Museum Catalogues of Coins was a series envisioned and initiated by Reginald Stuart Poole, Keeper of the Department of Coins and Medals, at the British Museum, between 1870 and 1893. The aim was to produce a scholarly series of catalogues of the collection, based on the British Museum's collection and other collections. The series continued after his retirement, and continues to this day, with the collection increasingly being made available online.

Series: Catalogue of the Greek Coins in the British Museum 
The series editor was Reginald Stuart Poole, and the authors/editors were Percy Gardner, Barclay Vincent Head, and Warwick Wroth.
 Vol. 1: Italy - R.S.  Poole (1873)
 Vol. 2: Sicily – P. Gardner,  B.V. Head, and R.S. Poole (1876)
 Vol. 3: The Tauric Chersonese, Sarmatia, Dacia, Moesia, Thrace, &c. – P. Gardner and B.V. Head (1877)
 Vol. 4: The Seleucid Kings of Syria – P. Gardner (1878)
 Vol. 5: Macedonia, etc. – B.V. Head (1879)
 Vol. 6: Thessaly to Aetolia – P. Gardner (1883)
 Vol. 7: The Ptolemies, kings of Egypt – R.S. Poole (1883)
 Vol. 8: Central Greece (Locris, Phocis, Boeotia, and Euboea) – B.V. Head (1884)
 Vol. 9: Crete and the Aegean Islands – W. Wroth (1886)
 Vol. 10: Peloponnesus (excluding Corinth) – P. Gardner (1887)
 Vol. 11: Attica-Megaris-Aegina – B.V. Head (1888)
 Vol. 12: Corinth, colonies of Corinth, etc. - B.V. Head (1889)
 Vol. 13: Pontus, Paphlagonia, Bithynia, and the Kingdom of Bosporus - W. Wroth (1889) 
 Vol. 14: Ionia - B.V. Head (1892) 
 Vol. 15: Of Alexandria and the nomes - R.S. Poole (1892)
 Vol. 16: Mysia - W. Wroth (1894)
 Vol. 17: Troas, Aeolis, and Lesbos - W. Wroth (1894)
 Vol. 18: Caria, Cos, Rhodes  &c. - B.V. Head (1897)
 Vol. 19: Lycia, Pamphylia, and Pisidia - G.F. Hill (1897)
 Vol. 20: Galatia, Cappadocia, and Syria - W. Wroth (1898) 
 Vol. 21: Lycaonia, Isauria, and Cilicia - G.F. Hill (1900)
 Vol. 22: Lydia - B.V. Head (1901)
 Vol. 23: Cyprus - G.F. Hill (1904)
 Vol. 24: Phrygia - B.V. Head (1906)                       
 Vol. 25: Phoenicia - G.F. Hill (1910)
 Vol. 26: Palestine (Galilee, Samaria, and Judaea) - G.F. Hill (1914)
 Vol. 27: Arabia Mesopotamia, and Persia : (Nabataea, Arabia Provincia, S. Arabia, Mesopotamia, Babylonia, Assyria, Persia, Alexandrine Empire of the East, Persis, Elymais, Characene) - G.F. Hill (1922)
 Vol. 28: Cyrenaica - E.S.G. Robinson (1927)

Series: Coins of the Roman Empire in the British Museum 
This series was prepared by Harold Mattingly, R. A. G. Carson, and P. V. Hill.
 Vol. 1: Augustus to Vitellius - H. Mattingly (1923), (2nd edition 1976, prepared by R.A.G. Carson)
 Vol. 2: Vespasian to Domitian - H. Mattingly (1930), (2nd edition 1976, prepared by R.A.G. Carson).
 Vol. 3: Nerva to Hadrian - H. Mattingly (1936), (2nd edition 1976, prepared by R.A.G. Carson).
 Vol. 4: Antoninus Pius to Commodus - H. Mattingly (1940), (2nd edition in 1968). 
 Vol. 5: Pertinax to Elagabalus - H. Mattingly (1950), (2nd edition 1975, prepared by R.A.G. Carson & P.V. Hill).
 Vol. 6: Severus Alexander to Balbinus and Pupienus - R.A.G. Carson (1962)

Series: Catalogue of Oriental Coins in the British Museum 
These catalogues were prepared by Stanley Lane Poole, and edited by Reginald Stuart Poole.
 Vol. 1: The coins of the Eastern Khaleefehs in the British Museum (1875)
 Vol. 2: The coins of the Mohammedan dynasties in the British Museum, classes III-X (1876)
 Vol. 3: The coins of the Turkman houses of Seljook, Urtuk, Zengee, etc, in the British Museum, classes X-XIV (1877)
 Vol. 4: The coinage of Egypt under the Fatimee Khaleefehs, the Ayyoobees and the Memlook Sultans, classes XIVa-XV (1879)
 Vol. 5: The coins of the Moors of Africa and Spain and the kings of the Yemen in the British Museum, classes XIVb-XXVII (1880)
 Vol. 6: The coins of the Mongols in the British Museum, classes XVIII-XXII (1881)
 Vol. 7: The coinage of Bukhara (Transoxiana) in the British Museum from the time of Timur to the present day, classes XXII- XXIII (1882)
 Vol. 8: The coins of the Turks in the British Museum, class XXVI (1883)
 Vol. 9: Additions to the Oriental collection 1876-1888, Part I: additions to vols I-IV (1889)
 Vol. 10: Additions to the Oriental Collection 1876-1888, part II, additions to vols V-VIII (1890)

Series: Catalogue of Indian coins in the British Museum 
These catalogues were compiled by Stanley Lane Poole, Percy Gardner, E. J. Rapson and John Allan, and the series was edited by Reginald Stuart Poole. For details of the collectors, authors, editors, printers, publishers and distributors of this series, see Wang and Errington (2019).

 Vol. 1: The coins of the sultans of Delhi in the British Museum - Stanley Lane Poole (1884)
 Vol. 2: The coins of the Muhammadan states of India in the British Museum - Stanley Lane Poole (1886)
 Vol. 3: The coins of the Greek and Scythic kings of Bactria and India in the British Museum - Percy Gardner (1886)
 Vol. 4: The coins of the Moghul emperors of Hindustan in the British Museum - Stanley Lane Poole (1892)
 Vol. 5: Catalogue of the coins of the Andhra dynasty, the Western Ksatrapas, the Traikutaka dynasty, and the "Bodhi" dynasty - E.J. Rapson (1908)
 Vol. 6: Catalogue of the coins of the Gupta dynasties and of Sasanka, king of Guada - J. Allan (1914)
 Vol. 7: Catalogue of the coins of ancient India - J. Allan (1936)

Series: Catalogue of Roman Provincial Coins 
This is a joint publication series with the Bibliothèque nationale de France, authored/edited by Andrew Burnett, Michel Amandry, Pere Pau Ripolles, Ian Carradice and M. Spoerri Butcher.
 Vol. 1: From the death of Caesar to the death of Vitellius (44 BC-AD 69) - A. Burnett, M. Amandry and P.P. Ripolles (1992), (reprinted with corrections 1998).
 Vol. 2: From Vespasian to Domitian (AD 69-96) - A. Burnett, M. Amandry and I. Carradice (1999)
 Roman provincial coinage: supplement 1 - A. Burnett, M. Amandry and P.P. Ripolles (1998)
 Vol. 7: De Gordien Ier à Gordien III (238-244 après J.-C.), Province d'Asie - M. Spoerri Butcher (2006)

Other catalogues relating to Europe (classical) 
 1814 - Veterum populorum et regum numi qui in Musèo Britannico adservantur - T. Coomb
 1874 - Roman medallions in the British Museum - H.A. Grueber
 1910 - Coins of the Roman Republic in the British Museum - H.A. Grueber 
 vol. 1 Aes rude, aes signatum, aes grave, and coinage of Rome from B.C. 268
 vol. 2 Coinages of Rome (continued), Roman Campania, Italy, The social war and the provinces
 vol. 3. Tables of finds and cognomina, indexes, plates, etc (2nd edition 1970, prepared by R.A.G. Carson & M.H. Crawford)
 1987-1995 -  Catalogue of the Celtic coins in the British Museum : with supplementary material from other British collections - by D. Allen, edited by J. Kent and M. Mays
 vol. 1: Silver coins of the East Celts and Balkan peoples
 vol. 2: Silver coins of North Italy, South and Central France, Switzerland and South Germany
 vol. 3: The bronze coins of Gaul
 1991 - Coins of Alexandria and the Nomes: a supplement to the British Museum - E. Christiansen (1991), ed. V.H. Hewitt & M.J. Price (British Museum Occasional Paper, no. 77)
 1991 - The coinage in the name of Alexander the Great and Philip Arrhidaeus: a British Museum catalogue, 2 vols - M.J. Price
 1992 - Sylloge Numorum Graecorum (Great Britain). The British Museum. Part 1, The Black Sea - M.J. Price
 1996 - British Iron Age coins in the British Museum - R. Hobbs
 2002 - Sylloge Numorum Graecorum (Great Britain). The British Museum. Part 2, Spain - P. Bagwell Purefoy and A. Meadows
 2010 - A catalogue of the Roman Republican Coins in the British Museum , with descriptions and chronology based on M.H. Crawford, Roman Republican Coinage (1974) - E. Ghey and I. Leins (eds), with contribution by M.H. Crawford

Other catalogues relating to Europe (medieval and modern) 
 1826 - Description of the Anglo-Gallic coins in the British Museum - T. Coomb
 1860 - English copper, tin and bronze coins in the British Museum, 1558-1958 - C.W. Peck
 1887 - Catalogue of English coins in the British Museum. Anglo-Saxon series, vol. 1 - F.C. Keary
 1893 - Catalogue of English coins in the British Museum. Anglo-Saxon series, vol. 2 (Wessex and England to the Norman Conquest) - F.C. Keary and H.A. Grueber
 1908 - Catalogue of the imperial Byzantine coins in the British Museum, 2 vols - W. Wroth
 1911 - Catalogue of the coins of the Vandals, Ostrogoths and Lombards and of the empires of Thessalonica, Nicaea and Trebizond in the British Museum - W. Wroth
 1916 - Catalogue of English coins in the British Museum. The Norman Kings (2 vols) - G.C. Brooke
 1951 - A catalogue of English coins in the British Museum. The cross-and-crosslets ('Tealby') type of Henry II - D.F. Allen
 1966 - Sylloge of Coins of the British Isles. 8, The Hiberno-Norse coins in the British Museum - R.H.M. Dolley
 1966 - The Carolingian coins in the British Museum - R.H.M. Dolley and K.F. Morrison
 1986 - Sylloge of Coins of the British Isles 34, British Museum: Anglo-Saxon coins. Athelstan to the reform of Edgar, 924-c.973 - M.M. Archibald and C.E. Blunt
 2010 - Paper money of England and Wales - C. Eagleton and A. Manopoulou (eds)

Other catalogues relating to Asia 
 1887 - The coins of the sháhs of Persia, Safavis, Afgháns, Efsháris, Zands, and Kájárs - R.S. Poole
 1892 - Catalogue of Chinese coins from the VIIth century B.C., to A.D. 621, including the series in the British Museum - Terrien De La Couperie
 1903 - Catalogue of the coins of Parthia - W. Wroth
 1941 - Catalogue of the Muhammadan coins in the British Museum, Catalogue of the Arab-Sassanian coins (Umaiyad governors in the East, Arab-Ephthalites, ‘Abassid governors in Tabaristan and Bukhara) - J. Walker
 1956 - Catalogue of the Muhammadan coins in the British Museum, Catalogue of the Arab-Byzantine and post-reform Umaiyad coins - J. Walker
 1992 - A catalogue of sycee in the British Museum: Chinese currency ingots, c.1750-1933 - J. Cribb
 1999 - Magic coins of Java, Bali and the Malay Peninsula, thirteenth to twentieth centuries: a catalogue based on the Raffles Collection of Coin-shaped Charms from Java in the British Museum - J. Cribb
 1999 - Catalogue of the Aksumite coins in the British Museum - S. Munro-Hay
 2004 - Money on the Silk Road: the evidence from Eastern Central Asia to c. AD 800, including a catalogue of the coins collected by Sir Aurel Stein - H. Wang
 2010 - Catalogue of the Japanese coin collection (pre-Meiji) at the British Museum : with special reference to Kutsuki Masatsuna (British Museum Research Publication, no. 174) - S. Sakuraki, H. Wang, P. Kornicki, with N. Furuta, T. Screech and J. Cribb
 2011 - Catalogue of Sikh Coins in the British Museum (British Museum Research Publication, no. 190) - Paramdip Kaur Khera

Other catalogues relating to medals and badges 
 2003 - Italian Medals c. 1530-1600 in British public collections (2 vols) - P. Attwood
 1930 - A corpus of Italian medals of the renaissance before Cellini - G.F. Hill
 1982 - A catalogue of the French medals in the British Museum, vol. 1, AD 1402-1610 - M. Jones
 1988 - A catalogue of the French medals in the British Museum, vol. 2, 1600-1672 - M. Jones
 2008 - Chairman Mao badges: symbols and slogans of the Cultural Revolution (British Museum Research Publications, no. 155) - H. Wang

References

External links
 Mary Hinton, "Numismatic Publications of the British Museum" (2011)
 Dept of Coins and Medals, The British Museum website
 Library of the Department of Coins and Medals, British Museum
 University of Pennsylvania - Online Books by British Museum. Department of Coins and Medals

British Museum
Numismatic catalogs